Washington's 12th legislative district is one of forty-nine districts in Washington state for representation in the state legislature. 

The rural district in north central Washington contains all  Chelan and Douglas and parts of  Okanogan and  Grant counties. The district's legislators are state senator Brad Hawkins and state representatives Keith Goehner (position 1) and Mike Steel (position 2), all Republicans.

See also
Washington Redistricting Commission
Washington State Legislature
Washington State Senate
Washington House of Representatives

References

External links
Washington State Redistricting Commission
Washington House of Representatives
Map of Legislative Districts

12
Chelan County, Washington
Douglas County, Washington
Okanogan County, Washington
Grant County, Washington